Alkyl polyglycosides (APGs) are a class of non-ionic surfactants widely used in a variety of cosmetic, household, and industrial applications. Biodegradable and plant-derived from sugars, these surfactants are usually glucose derivatives, and fatty alcohols.  The raw materials are typically starch and fat, and the final products are typically complex mixtures of compounds with different sugars comprising the hydrophilic end and alkyl groups of variable length comprising the hydrophobic end. When derived from glucose, they are known as alkyl polyglucosides.

Uses
APG is used to enhance the formation of foams in detergents. It is also used in the personal care industry because it is biodegradable and safe for sensitive skin.

Preparation
Alkyl glycosides are produced by combining a sugar such as glucose with a fatty alcohol in the presence of acid catalysts at elevated temperatures.

References

Glycosides
Non-ionic surfactants